Sut is a demon in Islam.

SUT may refer to:

 H2 SUT, a model of Hummer H2
 Shaanxi University of Technology, China
 Sharif University of Technology,  Iran
 Shenyang University of Technology,  China
 Society for Underwater Technology
 Solar updraft tower, a solar power plant
 Sport Utility Truck
 Suranaree University of Technology, Thailand
 System under test in software testing
 IATA airport code for Sumbawanga Airport
 London Underground station code for Sudbury Town tube station, England
 Sutherland, historic county in Scotland, Chapman code
 TV Shizuoka, a Japanese commercial broadcaster